Museu Lasar Segall (in English: Lasar Segall Museum) is an art museum in São Paulo, Brazil.

Designed in 1932 by architect Gregori Warchavchik, the building which houses the museum was the residence and art studio of Lithuanian Brazilian artist Lasar Segall until his death in 1957. Segall's family opened the museum in 1967 to showcase the work of the artist. The collection contains more than 3,000 items by Lasar Segall, including paintings, sculpture, drawings, and prints.

Museu Lasar Segall is located at 111 Rua Berta in the Vila Mariana district of São Paulo and is operated by a non-profit foundation.

See also

History of the Jews in Brazil

References

Biographical museums in Brazil
Museums in São Paulo
Art museums and galleries in Brazil
Art museums established in 1967
1967 establishments in Brazil
Houses completed in 1932